Sturmfahrt (German for Stormy voyage) is the seventh studio album by German band Eisbrecher.

Track listing

 Track 15 appears on the US version and German Limited Edition only
 "D-Zug" is a contraction of Durchgangzug, meaning express train
 "Krieger" can be translated as both the singular and plural form. In the Song's Lyrics only the plural form is used.

Charts

Weekly charts

Year-end charts

Sturmfahrt Tour
 29/09/17 - Oberhausen - Germany - Turbinenhalle
 30/09/17 - Hamburg - Germany - Mehr!Theater
 01/10/17 - Wiesbaden - Germany - Schlachthof
 02/10/17 - Stuttgart - Germany - Liederhalle
 03/10/17 - Műnchen - Germany - Zenith
 05/10/17 - Vienna - Austria - Gasometer
 06/10/17 - Dresdon - Germany - Alter Schlachthof
 07/10/17 - Leipzig - Germany - Haus Auensee
 08/10/17 - Berlin - Germany - Columbiahalle
 10/10/17 - Saarbrücken - Germany - Garage
 11/10/17 - Zűrich - Switzerland - X-tra
 13/10/17 - Eindhoven - Netherlands - De Effenaar
 14/10/17 - Paris - France - Le Trabendo

References

2017 albums
Eisbrecher albums
Metropolis Records albums
German-language albums